Pee Wee Wentz (Jerry E. Wentz, Jr.) (born October 6, 1941 in Danville, Virginia, USA) is a retired NASCAR Winston Cup Series driver. While his average starts were in 30th place, Wentz often did better at the conclusion of races by finishing an average of 24th place. From the age of 30 to the age of 33, Wentz was a late bloomer to the world of motorsports. Most drivers begin a serious pro stock car racing career between the ages of 16 and 19 years of age.

Motorsports career results

NASCAR
(key) (Bold – Pole position awarded by qualifying time. Italics – Pole position earned by points standings or practice time. * – Most laps led.)

Winston Cup Series

Daytona 500

References

1941 births
Living people
NASCAR drivers
Sportspeople from Danville, Virginia
Racing drivers from Virginia